The Act for the Government and Protection of Indians (Chapter 133, Cal. Stats., April 22, 1850), nicknamed the Indian Indenture Act was enacted by the first session of the California State Legislature and signed into law by the 1st Governor of California, Peter Hardeman Burnett. The legislation led to the forced labor of many Native Americans in California, in addition to regulating employment terms and redefining criminal activity and punishment. The legislation played a crucial role in sanctioning the California genocide, in which thousands of Native Californians were killed or enslaved by white settlers during the California Gold Rush.

Burnett, who signed the bill into law, explained in 1851 "[t]hat a war of extermination will continue to be waged between the races until the Indian race becomes extinct must be expected”. At the time of the legislation's passage, Native Californians were ineligible to become citizens, vote, or testify in court. The act facilitated the removal and displacement of Native Californians Indians from their traditional lands, separating at least a generation of children and adults from their families, languages, and cultures from 1850 to 1865.

Due to the nature of California court records, it is difficult to estimate of the number of Native Americans enslaved as a result of the legislation. During the time period between 1850 and 1870 in which the legislation was in effect, the Native Californian population of Los Angeles decreased from 3,693 to 219 people. Although the California legislature repealed parts of the statute after the 13th Amendment to the United States Constitution abolished involuntary servitude in 1865, it was not repealed in its entirety until 1937.  In 2019, Governor Gavin Newsom apologized on behalf of the State of California for the legislation.

Background

The California Gold Rush 

Prior to 1846, the non-native population of California was limited to less than 15,000 people, however, during the California Gold Rush, this population had grown to 100,000 people. Tensions built between Anglo American miners and Natives in the area. Early on in the Gold Rush, miners banded together in what were essentially militia groups, contributing to harassment and murder of Indigenous peoples in the area. This led to many instances of massacre, with groups of natives becoming smaller in size and weaker in their ability to fight back. They were already battling disease and lack of food. Also at this time, the scalps and ears of Natives were commodified, providing a market for the hunting of Native people within communities. Legislation passed through California and eventually the federal government authorized more than a million dollars to be used for expenses that these hunters may have accumulated.

Many communities through Gold Rush California offered bounties for Indian heads, Indian scalps, or Indian ears. And so the Indian raiders could bring the evidence of their kill in, and receive direct local compensation. Furthermore, the state of California passed legislation authorizing more than a million dollars for the reimbursement of additional expenses that the Indian hunters may have incurred. And then that was passed on eventually to the federal Congress, where Congress passed legislation also authorizing additional federal funds for this purpose permitting public funds to be used for this purpose, leading to sanctioned genocide in the area setting a precedent of horrific violence against Native Americans in California.

Beginning in July 1846, The United States occupied California. In an effort to mediate conflict, General Kearny, governor of California, appointed John Sutter and Mariano Vallejo to offices as subagents for the Indians, near Sacramento and San Francisco respectively,  in April 1847 to secure information pertaining to Native Californians in their respective areas, establish local regulations, and considered themselves protectors of those Indigenous to the area. However, the interactions that took place were not protective and not peaceful. As a result, Lieutenant Sherman authorized any person to shoot those Native to the area, if caught stealing a horse. Natives that were employed were required to have certification on them beginning November 1, 1847, and those caught without these certificates were to be considered horse-thieves, and arrested and punished as such. At the same time, the United States ruled that Native Americans in the area did not have the right to sell or lease the lands on which they resided.

Thomas Butler King was appointed to analyze conditions in California, particularly pertaining to Indigenous relations, by the President in 1849. Thomas Butler King's report misrepresented the Native Californians in the area, conveying that those Indigenous to the land were of the lowest grade of being, and held little inclination to work or improve their status. King made the assumption that they could benefit from teachings of arts of civilization. Adam Johnston had a similar report, concluding that Indigenous groups were in a low stage of development, and were being pushed out of their homes by migrants. These reports most likely held influence over the policies that came to follow, enforcing the concentration and distribution of resources by the federal government.

The First California Constitution 

In 1849, the first constitution of California was created by the delegates of the California Constitutional Convention. There was debate over whether those considered Native to California should have the right to vote. A minority cited the Declaration of Independence and taxation without representation as reason to allow it, though ultimately the majority won, and those considered Native to the area of California were not allowed to vote.

On April 22, 1850, the first California Legislature passed An Act for the Government and Protection of Indians, initially introduced as An Act relative to the protection, punishment, and government of Indians by Senator Chamberlin.

Provisions of the Act 
The Act in essence facilitated the removal of Indigenous groups native to present-day California, and separated a generation of children and adults from their native culture, families, and languages. Additionally, it indentured Indigenous members to White people in the area.

The provisions of this act of important note are as follows:

3. Employers are granted the right to obtain children and keep them until they reach 18 years old for men, and 15 years old for women. Consent was required from a parent or friend in order to gain a certificate of custody.

4. Required proper treatment of those in custody, with fines of not less than 10 dollars for inhumane treatment.

6. Complaints may be made before a Justice of the Peace, by white persons or Indians: but in no case shall a white man be convicted on any offence upon the testimony of an Indian.

9. If any tribe or village of Indians refuse or neglect to obey the laws set by the Justices of the Peace, the Justice of the Peace may punish the guilty chiefs or principal men by reprimand or fine, or otherwise reasonably chastise them.

13. Justices may require the chiefs and influential men of any village to apprehend and bring before them or him any Indian charged or suspected of an offence.

14. When an Indian is convicted of an offence before a Justice of the Peace, punishable by fine, any white man may, by consent of the justice, give bond for said Indian, conditioned for the payment of said fine and costs, and in such case the Indian shall be compelled to work for the person so bailing, until he has discharged or cancelled the fine assessed against him.

16. An Indian convicted of stealing horses, mules, cattle, or any valuable thing, shall be subject to receive any number of lashes not exceeding twenty-five, or shall be subject to a fine not exceeding two hundred dollars, at the discretion of the Court or jury.

20. Any Indian found loitering and strolling about, or frequenting public places where liquors are sold, begging, or leading an immoral or profligate course of life, shall be liable to be arrested on the complaint of any reasonable citizen of the county, authorizing and requiring the officer having him in charge or custody, to hire out such vagrant within twenty-four hours to the highest bidder. The money received for his hire, shall, after deducting the costs, and the necessary expenses, be paid into the County Treasury, to the credit of the Indian Fund. But if he have a family, the same shall be appropriated for their use and benefit.

Amendments 
Since ratification, there were minor changes made to the Act. Amendments to the act were passed in 1860. Under the amendment of section 3, it was allowed for Native children to be put under custody for the purpose of employment or training, and retain these services well into adulthood, namely 40 years old for men and 37 years old for women. Apprenticed minors were also capable of being obtained without the same parental or friend consent. Section 7 was amended so that if any person indenture a Native American except as provided in this act, he or they shall, upon conviction thereof, be fined and prosecuted. Later, in 1872, section 6 was repealed. In 1872, the California Constitution was amended, granting Native Americans the right to testify in courts of law.

Implementation 
This act allowed for any Native American that was strolling about to be declared vagrant by a white person and taken before a justice, to be subsequently sold at public auction, and was very much exploited in the overuse of this allowance by white Americans. At the time, it was common for ranchers and land owners to pay their workers, many of whom were Native Americans, in alcohol. Thus, public intoxication was almost encouraged, leading to frequent arrests and ensuing enslavement. After a few months of employment, it was common for enslaved Native Americans to be returned to the streets, typically in an area with alcohol in order to be declared a vagrant once again and be returned to labor. Workers were forced to work until their debt was paid, and these citizens did not have to right to vote or testify in court. These auctions occurred in the streets of present-day Los Angeles, acting as a flourishing slave market from 1850 to 1870. Many men made livings off of these auctions, with young Native Californians being sold anywhere from $30 to $150.

In the years of 1851 and 1852, the California Legislature financially incentivized harassment of Natives, authorizing pay of $1,100,000 for the "suppression of Indian hostilities." These bonds were continued in the year 1857 in the amount of $410,000. In April 1863, after the Emancipation Proclamation, the indenture and "apprecenticeship" of Native Americans was abolish by the California Legislature. The law was repealed in 1866, after the 14th Amendment was added to the United States Constitution. This stated that no state should infringe on any citizen's privileges or immunities, nor deprive any person of life, liberty, or property without due process of law, nor deny any one person the equal protection of the law. Lingering slave trafficking faded out in the 1870s, largely due to the decreasing population of Native Americans in the area as well as the increase in immigrants from other nations, namely China and European countries.

Treaties and Negotiations 
In 1851, a process of treaty writing began following the appointment of three commissioners by the federal government, with 18 treaties negotiated with various tribes in the California region by 1852. Cumulatively, these treaties set aside almost 7.5 million acres of land, close to one third of the land in California, specifically for Native use. These treaties also consisted of substantial nourishment, providing money for meals and resources in a hope to have the tribes be self-sufficient. Almost immediately, these treaties were opposed in the State Senate, and ordered to be opposed in ratification, calling for the removal of Indians due to the dislike of assigning large portions of promising agricultural land to those Native to the land. The United States government failed to ratify these treaties.

In 1852, the first Superintendent of Indian Affairs in California, Edward F. Beale, was appointed, with a plan to establish at least five reserves. $200,000 was appropriated by Congress, and the Tejon Reserve was established in September 1853. Around 2,000 Natives were brought to the 50,000 acre land. However, in focusing on these efforts Beale neglected many other vulnerable Native Californians. In 1854, he was removed from his position.

His replacement in 1854, Col. Thomas J. Henley, established the Nome Lacklee Reservation; Nome Cult, Mendocino; Fresno Indian Farm; and Kings River Indian Farm. These reservations suffered from crop damage and a lack of water, resulting in poor living conditions. Eventually, federal ownership was relinquished and once again those native to the land were forced to move. In 1870, oversight of the reserves was turned over to the Quaker Church, in addition to the Methodists, Baptists, and other churches, which were generally intolerant of Native American's traditional beliefs. Turning reservations into missions began the first tool in California-Native American relations used in attempt to assimilated Natives into the general population.

Concurrent legislation 
The Act for the Government and Protection of Indians is in line with other laws passed in the state of California during this time, such as the Greaser Act in 1855 and the Foreign Miners' Tax Act of 1850 (repealed in 1851 and reinstated in 1852).

Impact 
This act had devastating impacts on the population of those native to the area of California. Prior to the Gold Rush, it is safe to say there were between 100,000 and 150,000 people native to California living in the state. The location of these instances of violence and disregard of human rights have become significant in present-day movements. Native groups have since used this auction location as a common protest site, emphasizing the location's history of injustice. There were lasting effects of the tenets of the act itself, and many lingered far passed the original repeal of the law. Those Native to California were not allowed the right to vote, even after the 15th Amendment of the United States was ratified, affirming the right of all US citizens to vote. California Natives were not granted the right to vote until the Federal Citizenship Act of 1924 was passed.

See also
 California genocide
 Convict leasing
 Forced labor in California

References

External links
http://www.indiancanyon.org/ACTof1850.html 
https://web.archive.org/web/20171228103203/https://www.library.ca.gov/crb/02/14/02-014.pdf
http://clerk.assembly.ca.gov/sites/clerk.assembly.ca.gov/files/archive/Statutes/1850/1850.pdf
Freedom for California’s Indians, Smith, 2013

1850 in California
California Gold Rush
California statutes
Human rights in the United States
Indigenous rights in the United States
History of racism in California
Indigenous politics in North America
Legislation concerning indigenous peoples
Penal labor in the United States
Native American history of California